The Grants Pass City Hall and Fire Station, at 4th and H Streets in Grants Pass, Oregon, was built in 1912.  It was listed on the National Register of Historic Places in 1984.

It is a two-story brick building designed by Ashland architect W.F. Bowen.

It was built to house the city hall, a jail and a fire station. A fire hose drying tower was included.

References

Fire stations on the National Register of Historic Places in Oregon
Jails on the National Register of Historic Places in Oregon
City and town halls on the National Register of Historic Places in Oregon
National Register of Historic Places in Josephine County, Oregon
Government buildings completed in 1912
Former seats of local government
1912 establishments in Oregon